Cáelán is a variation of Irish Gaelic name Caolán (pronounced kay-lun, kale-un or quail-on) meaning "eternal warrior" or "holy water" and derives from 'caol' meaning slender, narrow or fine. 

Cáelán does not follow the grammatical rules in the Irish language i.e. caol le caol (slender with slender), leathan le leathan (broad with broad) highlighting the rule of 'vowel agreement' i.e. if the vowel before the second from last consonant in the word/name is slender (i or e) it must be followed by a slender vowel after that consonant. Cáelán does not comply with this rule as the e (slender) is followed by an a (broad) If the vowel is broad then it must be followed by a broad vowel as in Caolán (o followed by á - both broad).

Cael Ua Neamhnainn was a mythical Irish warrior and member of  Fionn Mac Cumhaill’s  warrior band the Fianna.

Whilst Cáelán is a less common first name, it appears to be growing in popularity. For example it was the 324th most popular baby boy name in Ireland in 2012 but has risen to 104th most popular in 2021. In Scotland it has risen from the 235th to the 127th most popular baby boys name in the same period.